Pen-y-fan Pond is a man-made reservoir in South Wales built around 1794-6 as part of the engineering works for the Crumlin Arm of the Monmouthshire Canal. The reservoir was used to maintain the water level in the canal.

The reservoir is formed by a large earth dam with stone facings, forming banks on three sides of a gentle slope. The outlet to the canal feeder forms a stone-lined, oval tunnel and a valve chamber is set into the bank above.

Pen Y Fan Pond Country Park features the reservoir, and provides a circular walk around the lake, and minimal facilities for visitors. The site has a car park, and is popular destination for families and fishermen. Fisherman may purchase day tickets from the Islwyn & District Angling club's website: http://www.islwynanglers.com

External links
Coflein entry
Country Park website

Reservoirs in Caerphilly County Borough
Tourist attractions in Caerphilly County Borough